Snagajob is an online marketplace for hourly work. Founded in 2000 with offices in Washington, D.C., Richmond, Virginia, and Charleston, South Carolina, Snagajob was able to secure a place in Fortune magazine's list of 25 Best Small Workplaces. Snagajob has also been named to Washingtonians "Great Places to Work" and Deloitte's "Fast 500", a ranking of the fastest growing technology, media, telecommunications, life sciences and clean technology companies in North America.

History
Shawn Boyer served as Snagajob's CEO from the website's launch in early 2000, to 2013; leading the company from a start-up to national employment network. Boyer was named America's Small Business Person of the year in 2008 by the Small Business Administration and Virginia Business Magazine's Person of the Year in 2009.

Boyer launched Snagajob.com out of his basement in his home in Washington D.C. In 2005, the company had grown to 25 employees and by 2007, had increased to 100 employees.

In 2011, Snagajob was named the best small business to work for by the Great Place to Work Institute. Virginia Governor Bob McDonnell visited Snagajob headquarters the day of the announcement to offer his congratulations.

Peter Harrison was named chief executive officer of Snagajob in April 2013 and served until July 2018.

In June 2016, Snagajob acquired PeopleMatter, a company that develops and provides software tools that help employers manage their workforce.

Snagajob is privately held and has raised over $141 million from investors including Adams Street Partners, Baird Venture Partners, C&B Capital, Rho Acceleration, NewSpring Capital, StarVest Partners and August Capital.

As of December 2016, Snagajob had over 500 employees, more than 85 million members registered on its platform and was active at over 450,000 customer locations.

On April 3, 2018 changed its name from Snagajob to Snag and launched a re-brand with a new visual identity to reflect the company's evolution.

Fabio Rosati was named Chairman and CEO of Snagajob in July 2018.

In June 2019, Rosati took on the role of Executive Chairman of the Board, and Mathieu Stevenson was appointed Chief Executive Officer.

In November 2019, Snagajob returned to its original name as a re-commitment to the mission of putting people in the right-fit position so they can maximize their potential and lead more fulfilling lives.

As of December 2019, Snagajob has over 300 employees, 100 million registered members and 700,000 employer locations.

See also
 Employment website

References

External links
 

Snagajob
Companies based in Richmond, Virginia
Software companies based in Virginia
Software companies of the United States 
Professional networks